NGC 4603 is a spiral galaxy located about 107 million light years away in the constellation Centaurus. It is a member of the Centaurus Cluster of galaxies, belonging to the section designated "Cen30".  The morphological classification is SA(s)c, which indicates it is a pure spiral galaxy with relatively loosely wound arms.

During 1999, this galaxy was the subject of an extended study using the Hubble Space Telescope to locate Cepheid variable stars. This is consistent with the distance estimate determined through redshift measurements. As of the time of this study, NGC 4603 was the most distant galaxy for which a distance estimate had been made using Cepheid variable.

On May 21, 2008, supernova SN 2008cn was discovered at a position 23.″2 north and 4.″7 east of the galaxy center. It was determined to be a high-luminosity Type II-P supernova, with a progenitor tentatively identified as a red supergiant with 15 ± 2 solar masses. Based upon the yellowish color, it may have been a member of a binary star system.

References

External links
 

Centaurus Cluster
Unbarred spiral galaxies
Centaurus (constellation)
4603
42510